The Show Goes On is a 1937 British musical comedy film directed by Basil Dean and starring Gracie Fields, Owen Nares and John Stuart.

Premise
The Show Goes On is a semi-biographical film about Sally Scowcroft (Gracie Fields) who is a mill worker who is plucked from obscurity and thrust towards fame and fortune by an ailing composer (Owen Nares) who needs a singer to perform his work.

Cast
 Gracie Fields as Sally Scowcroft
 Owen Nares as Martin Fraser
 John Stuart as Mack McDonald
 Horace Hodges as Sam Bishop 
 Edward Rigby as Mr. Scowcroft, Sally's Father  
 Amy Veness as Mrs. Scowcroft, Sally's Mother  
 Arthur Sinclair as Mike O'Hara  
 Cyril Ritchard as Jimmy 
 Jack Hobbs as Nicholson 
 Dennis Arundell as Felix Flack 
 Billy Merson as Manager 
 Frederick Leister as O.B. Dalton 
 Patrick Barr as Designer 
 Nina Vanna as Maniana 
 Tom Payne as Professor Augustino
 Queenie Leonard as Lilith Henderson  
 Frank Atkinson as Actor at O'Hara's Agency 
 Warren Earl Fisk as Townsman 
 Walter Fitzgerald as Soldier with His Family on Troopship 
 Laurence Hanray as Waiter 
 Mike Johnson as Busker 
 Andreas Malandrinos as Finale Set Designer  
 Jack Vyvian as Stage Manager at Pantomime

External links
 

1937 films
British musical comedy films
1937 musical comedy films
Associated Talking Pictures
Films directed by Basil Dean
British black-and-white films
1930s English-language films
1930s British films